The Sadz or Asadzwa, also Jigets, are a subethnic group of the Abkhazians. They are sometimes purported to have originated from the Sanigoi tribe mentioned by the Classic authors. In the 6th century, they formed a tribal principality, which later commingled with the Abasgoi, Apsilae and Missimianoi into the Kingdom of Abkhazia.

Until 1864 Sadz lived at the Black Sea coast north to Gagra until the Khosta River (Khamysh River). They formed the Sadzyn area, which consisted of the possessions of Kamysh, Arydba, Amarshan and Gechba clans, under the hegemony of Tsanba clan. The Ubykh princes Oblagua, Chizmaa and Dziash also originated from the Sadz.

Some think that in the 12-14th centuries a part of the Sadz have been forced to resettle to the northern mountainside of Caucasus Major under the Ubykh pressure. They formed there Abazin people. This is only one of the theories explaining the migration from Abkhazia of the ancestors of what is now the Abaza people. After the Russian-Circassian War ended in 1864 most of the Sadz were forced to turn muhajir, moving to the Ottoman Empire. Some of them settled in Adjara (then under the Ottoman possession). Now the Sadz dialect of the Abkhaz language is spoken only in Turkey. It consists of Akhaltsys and Tswyzhy subdialects.

The Sadz, Aibga and Akhchipsou tribes of Abkhazia were the last ethnic groups to have offered the resistance to the Russian advances during the Caucasus War. The last tribes conquered by Russians were Ahchypsy and Aibga, who lived in and around of what is now Krasnaya Polyana.

References
 Анчабадзе З. В. Из истории средневековой Абхазии. Сухум, 1959.
 Анчабадзе П. Д. Абаза. (К этно-культурной истории народов Северо-Западного Кавказа). КЭС, 1984, т. 8.
Анчабадзе Ю. Д., Волкова Н.Г. Этническая история Северного Кавказа XVI-XIX вв. // Материалы к серии "Народы и культуры". Выпуск XXVIII. «Народы Кавказа». М., 1993. Книга 1.
 Волкова Н. Г. Этнонимы и племенные названия Северного Кавказа. М., 1973.
 Инал-Ипа Ш. Д. Садзы. // Материалы к серии «Народы и культуры». Выпуск XXVIII. «Народы Кавказа», М., 1995. Книга 2.
 Чирикба, В.А. Расселение абхазов в Турции. Annex to: Инал-Ипа Ш. Д. Садзы. // Материалы к серии «Народы и культуры». Выпуск XXVIII. «Народы Кавказа», М., 1995. Книга 2, p. 260-277.
 Chirikba, V.A. Sadz, an Abkhaz Dialect in Turkey. In:Howard A. Aronson (ed.). NSL.8. Linguistic Studies in the Non-Slavic Languages of the Commonwealth of Independent States and the Baltic Republics, Chicago: The University of Chicago, 1996, p. 67-81.
 Chirikba, V.A. Distribution of Abkhaz Dialects in Turkey. In: A. Sumru Özsoy (ed.). Proceedings of the Conference on Northwest Caucasian Linguistics, 10–12 October 1994. Studia Caucasologica III. Novus forlag - Oslo, Instituttet for Sammenlignende Kulturforskning, 1997, p. 63-88.
 Chirikba, V.A. A Grammar of Sadz Abkhaz (Forthcoming).

History of ethnic groups in Russia
Ethnic groups in Turkey
Abkhaz diaspora
Sub-ethnic groups
Abkhaz people